Ranipur Kamboan  is a village in Phagwara Tehsil in Kapurthala district of Punjab State, India. The village is administrated by a Sarpanch, who is an elected representative.

Transport 
Bolinna Doaba Railway Station,  Chiheru Railway Station are the very nearby railway stations to Ranipur Kamboan however, Jalandhar City Rail Way station is 16 km away from the village.  The village is 111 km away from Sri Guru Ram Dass Jee International Airport in Amritsar and the another nearest airport is Sahnewal Airport  in Ludhiana which is located 51 km away from the village.

References

External links
  Villages in Kapurthala
 Kapurthala Villages List

Villages in Kapurthala district